Olexander Smakula (1900 in Dobrovody, Austria-Hungary, today Ukraine – 17 May 1983 in Auburn, Massachusetts, USA) was a Ukrainian physicist known for the invention of anti-reflective lens coatings based on optical interference.

Biography
Smakula was born to a peasant family in Dobrovody village, Austria-Hungary (today Ternopil Oblast, Ukraine). After finishing his studies at the Ternopil gymnasium he applied to the University of Göttingen from which he graduated in 1927. Afterwards he worked as an assistant of Prof. Robert Pohl. After his short stay at Odessa University, Smakula returned to Germany as head of an optics laboratory in Heidelberg. From 1934 he worked at the Carl Zeiss AG company in Jena. While at Zeiss, in 1935, Smakula invented and patented interference-based optical anti-reflective coatings, a significant advance in optical technology. The patent mentions practically almost no light absorbing organic and inorganic materials can be used for such coatings.
These coatings remained a German military secret for several years, until the Allies discovered the secret during World War II.
During World War II, Smakula collaborated with the Nazi regime and worked on infrared guidance for missiles. After the end of World War II Smakula went to the US with other German physicists, where he first worked in Virginia investigating materials for infrared technology. In 1951 he was offered a professorship at MIT, where he mainly did research into crystalline materials. Olexander Smakula died on May 17, 1983, and is buried in Auburn, Massachusetts, USA.

References

External links
 History of Camera Lenses from Carl Zeiss - 1935 - Olexander Smakula develops anti-reflection coating
 Lens coating invented and developed by Olexander Smakula
 Physicist Oleksandr Smakula and his contributions to science. Welcome to Ukraine 2008, 3.
 Encyclopedia Aeronautica about Smakula

1900 births
1983 deaths
20th-century Ukrainian inventors
20th-century Ukrainian physicists
University of Göttingen alumni
Massachusetts Institute of Technology faculty
Soviet expatriates in Germany
Soviet emigrants to the United States